Guy Willy Razanamasy (19 December 1928 – 18 May 2011) was a Malagasy politician who served as Prime Minister of Madagascar from 1991 to 1993.

Born in Antananarivo, Razanamasy worked as a pharmacist and drug manufacturer before becoming the director of pharmacological society  of "cofarma" and entering politics.  He was elected Mayor of Antananarivo in the 1980s.

President of Madagascar Didier Ratsiraka came under intense pressure in August 1991.  Facing a general strike, a rival government formed by the Committee of Active Forces (FV) and led by Jean Rakotoharison, and an army reluctant to obey his orders, he replaced Prime Minister of Madagascar Victor Ramahatra with Razanamasy.  Razanamasy called on the FV to join his government, and was able to persuade a few individuals to enter his first cabinet, then in October was able to sign an accord with the opposition to form a transitional government for a maximum of eighteen months.  Although all real power was removed from Ratsiraka, Razanamasy remained in position and members of the FV joined his expanded cabinet.  He retained the post until 1993.

In 1994, Razanamasy again became Mayor of Antananarivo, serving out his five-year term.  He stood in the 1996 presidential election as the candidate of the Confederation of Civil Societies for Development, but took only 1.2% of the total votes cast and was eliminated in the first round.

References

1928 births
2011 deaths
Merina people
Prime Ministers of Madagascar
Mayors of Antananarivo
Malagasy pharmacists
Place of death missing